Liu Zhicai (Chinese: 刘志才 born October 20, 1954) is a Chinese football coach and a former international player. As a player he was a defender who represented Shenyang Army and Bayi Football Team while internationally he played for China in the 1980 Asian Cup.

Management career 
Liu Zhicai would manage amateur minor-league club Tianjin Runyulong in the 2010 league season, however the recently formed ambitious club would decide that they wanted to be a professional unit the following season and buy Anhui Jiufang F.C.'s position within the second tier of Chinese football. This would then see a turbulent period in Liu's career where he would see the club move to Shenyang and rename themselves as Shenyang Shenbei while having to overhaul his squad to compete with professional football. In the 2011 league season Liu looked like he was able to produce a team that were able to fight for promotion, however it would soon be clear that the club would finish in mid-table and despite finishing in a respectable sixth there would be rumours that Liu would be sacked at the end of the season. Unfortunately these rumours would be true and the ambitious club would hire Chinese FA Cup winning coach Arie Haan at the beginning of 2012.

Career statistics

International statistics

References

External links
Team China Stats
Player profile at Sodasoccer

1954 births
Living people
Chinese football managers
Chinese footballers
Footballers from Dalian
China international footballers
1980 AFC Asian Cup players
Bayi Football Team players
Asian Games bronze medalists for China
Asian Games medalists in football
Association football defenders
Footballers at the 1978 Asian Games
Medalists at the 1978 Asian Games